Douglas Razzano (born October 22, 1988) is an American former competitive figure skater. He is the 2014 CS Ice Challenge champion and a silver medalist at three senior internationals — the 2014 Challenge Cup, 2011 Finlandia Trophy, and 2010 Ice Challenge. He placed fourth at the 2007 JGP Final after coming in as the first alternate.

Razzano was coached by Doug Ladret from the age of twelve. He retired from competitive skating on May 19, 2015.

Programs

Competitive highlights
GP: Grand Prix; CS: Challenger Series; JGP: Junior Grand Prix

References

External links
 
 Douglas Razzano at IceNetwork
 Official site

American male single skaters
1988 births
Living people
People from Mineola, New York